This is a list of Swedish-language novels translated into English.

List

See also 
List of Swedish-language novels

Swedish-language literature
Lists of novels